The 2015 Greek football scandal emerged on 6 April 2015 when prosecutor Aristidis Korreas' 173-page work was revealed. Telephone tapping operated by the National Intelligence Service of Greece since 2011 has played a significant role in the case. According to the prosecutor's conclusion, Greek Football Federation members Theodoros Kouridis, and Georgios Sarris are suspected of directing a criminal organization since 2011. The goal behind their scheme was to "absolutely control Greek football's fate by the methods of blackmailing and fraud", exploiting the self-governing ("autonomy") status of national football federations promoted by FIFA and UEFA. Referees, judges, football directors and chairmen are also involved in the scandal. All defendants were acquitted of all charges.

Prosecutor's conclusion

Organization's beginnings

In the summer of 2011, the Greek football was under the storm of Koriopolis scandal, a massive match-fixing case with many officials involved.

According to the recent prosecutor's conclusion, Theodoros Kouridis, Aristidis Stathopoulos, Georgios Sarris and Euboea Football Clubs Association president Ioannis Papakonstantinou later met at Hilton Hotel in Athens in December 2011. The decisions that they came up with after their meeting were to support Sarris' candidacy for the presidency of the Greek Football Federation in the upcoming election, aiming to control it, and that Evangelos Marinakis would have a leading role in the organization.

One of the first actions of the new presidency of HFF was the replacement of the two football prosecutors (Fakos, Antonakakis) with two others (Petropoulos, Karras). The investigation inside the Federation for the Koriopolis scandal stopped and never resumed ever since. 

In January 2012, according to the prosecutor, Kouridis and Stathopoulos following Marinakis orders, secretly met referee Petros Konstantineas, currently a member of the Hellenic Parliament and a key participant in the fight against football corruption, and demanded from him to favour Olympiakos against Xanthi at their 22 January 2012 clash. Konstantineas refused and Olympiakos were defeated by Xanthi. A month later, according to the prosecutor, Marinakis allegedly ordered unknown people to bomb Konstantineas' bakery, which led to bakery's demolition on 23 February 2012, an incident that "established Olympiakos' president domination on Greek football".

Expanding activity

Marinakis, Kouridis and Sarris used prepaid mobile phones owned typically by Chinese and Pakistani immigrants so as to communicate avoiding surveillance from the National Intelligence Service of Greece, although they were eventually wiretapped nonetheless. The phone Marinakis used was registered to a Pakistani individual named "Fataul Haque", while Sarris' phone was registered to a Chinese one named "Qianqian Zhang".

Korreas' conclusion stated that Olympiakos owner's influence expanded to a wider range beyond his own club and that following his interests, various illegal acts were committed. Specific referees were ordered to favor Platanias F.C., a club that was under Olympiakos' influence, against Panachaiki F.C. in a 2012 Football League play-off match which led to Platanias F.C. promoting to Super League. He intervened in Football League's Disciplinary Committee work in order to evoke favorable decisions for Tyrnavos 2005 F.C. against Niki Volou. Most important, he managed to influence most of the local Football Clubs Associations across Greece as well as most of the Super League clubs, which out of subordination and financial survival reasons agreed and aided Marinakis' right-hand Giorgos Sarris to become elected as the new president of Greek Football Federation.

The prosecutor's conclusion goes on mentioning that Super League's control was taken using Marinakis' stated power and economic strength. Olympiakos even maintains a large roster aiming to loan players to weaker clubs, succeeding in that manner to "preserve their influence along the league". Club's officials have been recorded by the National Intelligence Service of Greece of even demanding and eventually managing to place in Panionios' manager position Dimitrios Eleftheropoulos, Olympiacos' former goalkeeper, paying half of his contract salary.

Expanding violence
Various acts of violence are also included inside the prosecutor's conclusion against referees (Giorgos Daloukas, Dimitris Kyrkos etc.), journalists and others. In a separate case, launched in July 2011, Marinakis is accused also of instigation and facilitating acts of violence. According to telephone recordings, Marinakis, along with the president of second-division club Ilioupoli, Giorgos Tsakogiannis, and others, cooperated so that a group of hardcore Olympiakos fans would travel on 13 March 2011 to a third division match and provoke riots to bring about a penalty. The prosecutor's report says that "Tsakogiannis informed [Ioannis] Papadopoulos that he had made arrangements and Evangelos Marinakis was aware of the plan for Olympiakos fans to cause riots".

In one of the recorded conversations, the ex-board member of Olympiakos Emilios Kotsonis (currently imprisoned for a case of a ship with two tonnes heroin, which was caught by the Greek authorities with the help of the US Drug Enforcement Administration) refers to the severe crowd violence during a derby match of Panathinaikos against Olympiakos (2011–12 season), for which Panathinaikos was docked three points and punished €212.000 as fine, saying that Golden Dawn was behind the incident.

Consequent state
Sarris, Kouridis and Stathopoulos along with their colleagues and former referees Briakos and Douros, compiled the referees' charts for the 2011–12 and 2012–13 seasons of Greek Leagues, including referees of their utmost trust, such as Ioannidis, Amparkiolis and Kampaksis, who were used in crucial games in favor of the organization's interests. Among others, they refereed the match of Apollon Smyrni F.C. against Panionios, being ordered to favour Panionios, as well as the match of Levadiakos F.C. against Panetolikos F.C., being ordered to favour Levadiakos. Levadiakos' owner Giannis Kompotis, having acquaintances among the organization's circle, regularly benefit from them.

Concluding, the prosecutor points up that Marinakis managed to currently dominate Greek football using his power and subsequent alliances and that furthermore, taking advantage of the situation, Olympiakos have been winning the Greek Super League each season since 2011, an achievement that automatically gives the club the income reward of around €20 million per year out of UEFA's market pool resulting from their subsequent participation in the UEFA Champions League Group Phase. In one of the recorded conversations, the UEFA's Deputy General Secretary, Theodore Theodoridis, partner of Michel Platini and son of vice-president of Olympiakos Savvas Theodoridis, is heard to provide help to Marinakis. Theodoridis is appearing to be the person who is responsible for the good relations between Platini and the various Football Federations ensuring his reelection.

According to the Greek sports-site sdna.gr the Greek Federation has copied the code of FIFA Ethics Committee, but removing all the rules referring to punishments of officials, aiming to self-protection. The Federation still refuses to send its articles of association to the Greek General Secretary of Sports.

Other testimonies and statements 
In 2014, Stamatis Vellis, ex-president of Apollon Smyrni, testified to the district attorney that the fate of his team depended on actions of corrupted members of the Hellenic Football Federation, naming a number of officials currently accused, and for that reason he quit from the presidency of his club and the Greek football.

In September 2014, Olivier Kapo, a former player of Levadiakos F.C., confirmed the alleged existence of a criminal organization within the Greek football industry, when he stated in the French press that in Greek football, "everything is corrupted [and] mafia-controlled."

On 27 May 2015, the President of the Football Union of Thessaly, Anastasios Batziakas (head of a Union which appealed the current presidency of the Hellenic Football Federation due to corruption), testified that his life was threatened by anonymous calls.

In August 2015, Petros Konstantineas stated that the referees in Greece should be professionals and criticized the situation about Hugh Dallas for getting paid without having any jurisdiction. He described also the Football Federation as a company who "pop in and out the Greek courts" and that Syriza "is going to finish the job".

On 2 March 2016, the owner oF PAOK FC, Ivan Savvidis, criticized the Hellenic Football Federation's officials and referees, stating at TV that "he is ashamed to be linked with the Greek football" and asked the resignation of Olympiakos' president, Marinakis, and the Federation's president. The board of directors of PAOK also asked the resignation of the Federation's president and the expulsion of all the accused persons from the Greek football, such as arbitration with foreign referees from the next season.

On 18 March 2016, Panathinaikos FC President Giannis Alafouzos sued Mr Marinakis and judges Tziblakis and Poulios for the Koriopolis case.

Current judicial status 

As of June 2015, suspects are being questioned by investigating judge Georgios Andreadis. Andreadis added 10 suspects to the 16 that prosecutor Aristidis Korreas had proposed. Court council is due to decide who are to put on trial.

Evangelos Marinakis was questioned on 18 June 2015 and he was released on a €200,000 bail. He is also forced to stop being involved in any football activity, as well as he must report to a police station every 15 days.

Koriopolis progress
In July 2015, and after the prosecutor's proposal to the penal justice, it was announced that are going to be tried for the Koriopolis: the players Avraam Papadopoulos, Kostas Mendrinos, the officials Achilleas Beos, Ioannis Kombotis (owner of Levadiakos F.C.), Dimitris Tzelepis (chairman of Panthrakikos F.C.), Giorgos Borovilos (president of Asteras Tripolis), Dimitris Bakos (owner of Asteras Tripolis), Michalis Kountouris (president of amateur Olympiacos CFP and board member of Olympiacos F.C.) and many more. On 5 September 2015, a new conversation recorded by the National Intelligence Service came in the light, with the ex-board member of Olympiakos Emilios Kotsonis asking for a meeting from a judge of the case (Giannis Tziblakis) with Evangelos Marinakis, who was finally cleared for Koriopolis. In the case intervened the Court of Cassation, the supreme court of Greece for civil and criminal law, and the case for Marinakis is going to be examined again.

Additional suspects 

Additional suspects include Veria F.C. Director of Football Giorgos Lanaris and former owner Giorgos Arvanitidis, regarding 6 January 2013 match of Olympiakos F.C. against Veria. Veria player Nikolaos Georgeas and club's manager Dimitris Kalaitzidis at the time, testified in March 2015 that Lanaris following Arvanitidis orders demanded from Veria players to lose with a 3–0 score, which eventually happened. According to Andreadis, both Marinakis and Arvanitidis had agreed on the match fixing. Guillermo Pérez, football player of Veria at that time, stated also to the prosecutor that the game was fixed. However, Veria was judged as innocent for the suspected fixed match against Olympiakos by the appeal committee of the Football Federation.

Atromitos F.C. football director Giannis Agkelopoulos along with club's owner Giorgos Spanos were also questioned by Andreadis on the suspicion of manipulating 4 February 2015 match of Olympiakos against Atromitos, following Panathinaikos F.C. football director Takis Fyssas testimony. Fyssas claimed that Atromitos coach at that time, Ricardo Sá Pinto, had shared with him that Agkelopoulos demanded from the coach not to use Pitu Garcia, Napoleoni, Katsouranis and Kivrakidis for the match in question. At the questioning, Agkelopoulos and Spanos handed over a letter written by Sa Pinto claiming that the story is not true, while Fyssas claims the story is known even by Fernando Santos' assistant, Ricardo Santos. Santos confirmed him after talking to the Press, stating that he had informed Fyssas through a text message which then became part of the latter's testimony.

UEFA's reaction 
On 30 June 2015, UEFA's General secretary Gianni Infantino stated that Olympiakos will keep their spot in the Champions League for the time, such as Asteras Tripoli FC. Later, the Court of Arbitration for Sport confirmed the participation of Olympiakos in the Champions League.

On 17 June 2015, the English sports-site Inside World Football had revealed that UEFA's integrity officer for the HFF (Dimitris Davakis) didn't state to the UEFA's Ethics and Disciplinary Inspector, Miguel Liétard Fernandez-Palacios, the judicial process and the alleged involvement of Asteras Tripoli in the Greek match-fixing scandal of Koriopolis, regarding their participation in the UEFA Europa League.

According to the Telegraph, UEFA did not respond to a request to confirm whether Infantino's deputy, Theodore Theodoridis, had recused himself from any discussions or decisions about the handling of the Olympiakos case, because of the relationship of Theodoridis's father, Savvas, vice-president of Olympiakos, and Theodoridis Jnr.

Final acquittal of all defendants
On January 28, 2021, the three-member Criminal Court of Appeals  acquitted the leader of Olympiacos, Vangelis Marinakis, of all the charges against him in the trial of 28. The same happened with all the defendants in the case. After a thorough analysis of all the elements of the investigation, from the testimony of the witnesses (and the contradictions they encountered) and from the rejection of the pre-investigation conclusion by the lawyers of the accused, the court decided to reject all the accusations. 

A case that lasted almost six years and occupied Greek football, tarnishing reputations, has now been closed definitively and irrevocably.

Accusations

See also 
Koriopolis
2015 FIFA corruption case

References 

2015 scandals
Association football controversies
Super League Greece
Football in Greece
Corruption in Greece
Match fixing
Scan
Sports scandals in Greece